Baltzer is an unincorporated community located in northern Sunflower County, Mississippi.

Notable people
 Eugene Moore - Member of Illinois House of Representatives; Recorder of Deeds for Cook County, Illinois.

References

Unincorporated communities in Sunflower County, Mississippi
Unincorporated communities in Mississippi